The House of the Silver Wedding is the name given to the archaeological remains of a Roman house in Pompeii, buried in the ash from the Eruption of Mount Vesuvius in 79 AD. The house was excavated in 1893 and was named after the silver wedding anniversary of Umberto and Margherita of Savoy, which took place in that year.

Description 

The house is in the last side street off Via Vesuvio, next to an as-yet unexcavated part of the site. Built sometime around 300 BC and renovated in the early 1st century AD, it was the domus of a wealthy resident. Its architecture is classical and it bears fine decoration in the atrium, which has four tall Corinthian columns supporting the roof and an elegantly ornamented exedra. It is generally considered to be the finest tetrastyle atrium in the city, with its compluviate roof with palmette antefixes and lion-headed gutter spouts. 

There are two gardens: the largest with a central pool and a triclinium; the other with a bath-house, open-air swimming pool, kitchen, and a living room that has a mosaic floor, wall paintings and a barrel-vaulted ceiling supported by four octagonal columns decorated in imitation of porphyry.

References

Further reading

S